DCG may refer to:

 DCG Development, a development firm in Clifton Park, New York; owners of Clifton Park Center
 DCG Radio-TV Network, Quezon Province, Philippines
 DCG-IV, a research drug
 Definite clause grammar, a means of expressing grammatical relationships
 Democratic Montenegro (Demokratska Crna Gora), a political party in Montenegro
 Deputy Commanding General , wartime head of a military district in the German Empire and Nazi Germany 
 Digital Currency Group, is an venture capital company focusing on the digital currency market
 Discontinuous gas exchange, a physiological pattern of respiratory gas exchange used by insects
 Discounted cumulative gain, a performance measure for search engine ranking algorithms
 Doğu Çalışma Grubu, an alleged group within the Turkish military
 Guatemalan Christian Democracy (Spanish: Democracia Cristiana Guatemalteca), a political party
 BCCM/DCG, a diatom collection part of the Belgian Co-ordinated Collections of Micro-organisms
 The DCG Brothers, a Chicago based Hip Hop duo.

See also
 Digital collectible card game (DCCG)